Gordan's lemma is a lemma in convex geometry and algebraic geometry. It can be stated in several ways.

 Let  be a matrix of integers.
 The semigroup of integral points in a rational convex polyhedral cone is finitely generated.
 An affine toric variety is an algebraic variety (this follows from the fact that the prime spectrum of the semigroup algebra of such a semigroup is, by definition, an affine toric variety).

The lemma is named after the mathematician Paul Gordan (1837–1912). Some authors have misspelled it as "Gordon's lemma".

Proofs 
There are topological and algebraic proofs.

Topological proof 
Let  be the dual cone of the given rational polyhedral cone. Let  be integral vectors so that  Then the 's generate the dual cone ; indeed, writing C for the cone generated by 's, we have: , which must be the equality. Now, if x is in the semigroup

then it can be written as

But since x and the first sum on the right-hand side are integral, the second sum is a lattice point in a bounded region, and so there are only finitely many possibilities for the second sum (the topological reason). Hence,  is finitely generated.

Algebraic proof 

 If S is finitely generated, then , v an integral vector, is finitely generated.
Put , which has a basis . It has -grading given by
.
By assumption, A is finitely generated and thus is Noetherian. Now, the semigroup  is the image of S under a linear projection, thus finitely generated and so  is finitely generated. Hence,  is finitely generated then.

Lemma: Let A be a -graded ring. If A is a Noetherian ring, then  is a finitely generated -algebra.

Proof: Let I be the ideal of A generated by all homogeneous elements of A of positive degree. Since A is Noetherian, I is actually generated by finitely many , homogeneous of positive degree. If f is homogeneous of positive degree, then we can write  with  homogeneous. If f has sufficiently large degree, then each  has degree positive and strictly less than that of f. Also, each degree piece  is a finitely generated -module. Then the chain of the ideals  stabilizes in finite steps; so does the chain ) Thus, by induction on degree, we see  is a finitely generated -algebra.

Applications 
A multi-hypergraph is called regular if all vertices have the same degree. It is called decomposable if it has a proper nonempty subset that is regular too. For any integer n, let  be the maximum degree of an indecomposable multi-hypergraph on n vertices. Gordan's lemma implies that  is finite. Proof: for each subset S of vertices, define a variable xS (a non-negative integer). Define another variable d (a non-negative integer). Hence, the set of non-decomposable multi-hypergraphs is finite.

See also 

 Birkhoff algorithm is an algorithm that, given a bistochastic matrix (a matrix which solves a particular set of equations), finds a decomposition of it into integral matrices. It is related to Gordan's lemma in that it shows that the set of these matrices is generated by a finite set of integral matrices.

References

See also 
Dickson's lemma

Lemmas
Theorems in convex geometry
Algebraic geometry